Yupo may refer to:
 Yupo (manufacturer), produces a Tyvek-like fabric 
 Yupo Subdistrict, a subdistrict (tambon) of Thailand